Earth Watchers Center (EWC) is a non-profit environmental organization in Iran which has been functioning since September 2002.

EWC's aim is to help reduce the existing environmental problems and to preserve the Earth's heritage through raising public awareness. They plan to achieve this by reporting case studies based on data obtained from surveying and fact-finding trips, by printing educational pamphlets and by arranging public educational scientific tours.
EWC holds that the most fundamental step to be taken toward raising public awareness and knowledge is to inform people from all social strata, from the layman up to the highest level of decision makers.
Informing people is the main activity of EWC, and is being done by two outlets: its website and annual magazine.

The EWC's motto is Information → Awareness → Conservation.

A summary of EWC's activities 
 Publication of more than 100 pieces of news related to the environment from Iran and the world since the beginning of the activity to January 2006. These are in order of the most frequent in the news to the least: Forests in the north of Iran, wetlands, watersheds in Tehran, natural disasters (flood, storm and earthquake), oil pollution, sewage and waste, water and air pollution,  Climate change, poisons and Stable tourism.
 Book writing and publication concerning forests in the north of Iran (values and threats) named "At The Threshold Of Bidding Farewell To Ancient North Forests". This book was selected as the best book of the year among 100 books concerning environmental matters focusing on the environmental issues in 2004 by Mehrgan Institute.
 Publication of four informative magazines.
 Attending different Environmental fairs and being selected as the "top Iranian non-profit environmental organization in 2005".
 Attending demonstrations such as protesting against destruction of Miankaleh Pond by oil companies.
 Taking more than 900 pictures from environmental values and threats regarding Ancient Forests, Iranian Wetlands, Tehran Watersheds, oil pollution in the south of Tehran, Sewage and waste pollution, Iranian deserts and rare species, more than 60 cases of the rare species were displayed on the website.
 More than 45 group-visiting carried out in different places (Forests, Wetlands, Watersheds, etc.).

References

External links
 Earth Watchers Center – official website

Environmental organisations based in Iran